Gorica is a settlement immediately to the west of Moravče in central Slovenia. The area is part of the traditional region of Upper Carniola. It is now included with the rest of the Municipality of Moravče in the Central Slovenia Statistical Region.

Name
Gorica was attested in historical sources as Goriczen in 1358 and Puͤhel in 1458.

References

External links

Gorica on Geopedia

Populated places in the Municipality of Moravče